Christmas with Weezer is a Christmas EP by American rock band Weezer. It was released through DGC / Interscope on December 16, 2008.

The six tracks were originally recorded for the previously released iOS video game Christmas with Weezer. The Tap Tap versions of these songs lack the background vocals found in the released versions and are different mixes.

Track listing
 "We Wish You a Merry Christmas" – 1:26
 "O Come All Ye Faithful" – 2:04
 "O Holy Night" – 4:04
 "The First Noel" – 2:22
 "Hark! The Herald Angels Sing" – 1:32
 "Silent Night" – 2:22

References

2008 EPs
2008 Christmas albums
Christmas albums by American artists
Weezer EPs
Christmas EPs
Alternative rock Christmas albums
Covers EPs